Hugh Evans may refer to:

Hugh Evans (writer) (1854–1934), Welsh publisher, founder of Gwasg y Brython, author of Cwm Eithin
Hugh Evans (footballer) (1919–2010), Welsh footballer
Hugh Evans (basketball) (1941–2022), American basketball referee
Hugh Evans (humanitarian) (born 1983), Australian humanitarian, founder of Global Citizen, Global Poverty Project and Oaktree
Hugh Evans (politician), Welsh county councillor and county council leader
Hugh Evans (priest) (died 1587), Dean of St Asaph
Hugh Arfon Evans (1913–1995), Welsh Anglican priest
Sir Hugh Evans, a character in The Merry Wives of Windsor